Perryville High School is a public secondary school in Perryville, Maryland, United States. The school is operated by Cecil County Public Schools. Enrollment for 2015 is reported as 810 students.

Sports
Boys: Baseball, Basketball, Cross Country, Football, Golf, Lacrosse, Soccer, Tennis, Track and Field, Wrestling
Girls: Cheerleading, Dance, Basketball, Cross Country, Field Hockey, Golf, Lacrosse, Soccer, Softball, Tennis, Track and Field, Volleyball

In 2016, the Perryville Panthers completed an undefeated season in softball to win the state championship. June 7 was made the Perryville High School softball team day in honor of this accomplishment.

Perryville High School's marching band has 10 straight Maryland state 1A Championship titles and many other awards.

References

External links
CCPS webpage for Perryville High School

Perryville, Maryland
Public high schools in Maryland
Schools in Cecil County, Maryland